La Victoria/Corozal Football Club is a Belizean football team which competed in the Belize Premier Football League (BPFL) of the Football Federation of Belize. It was founded as La Victoria FC in 1985.  After the dismantling of the first division, to give way to newly created Semi-Pro league, La Victoria took on the brilliant idea of combining and bringing the best talent from every club and forming a highly competitive team.    Their idea paid off and soon they would find themselves scouting and recruiting players from around the district; this brought forward the emergence of talented players of the like of Gerardo Campos (Caledonia), Ariel Magana (Ranchito), Steve Hall (Calcutta), Ramiro ‘Milo’ Munoz (Xaibe), Clifford ‘Calvo’ Usher (Freedom Fighters) Pelon Barahona (Beach Boys); to name a few. 
  
The team first battled San Joaquin FC for north supremacy and their success then gave way and brought forward the opportunity of adding Mexican players who solidified the team and took them to become a powerhouse in Belizean Football.    La Victoria would dominate the football scene in the mid to late 90’s.  They won the Semi-Pro championship with an outstanding display of football.  In the international scene they went on the win several key matches allowing them to move on to the next round in the Concacaf Champion of champion league; notably beating Nicaragua’s Dirigian Gen.  

The team would continue their dominance along with their upbringing of new and talented players; the likes of Joe West, Roberto ‘Berti’ Campos, Delmar Sutherland (RIP) as well as additional Mexican players.  However, their new challenger would be up and coming Juventus FC of Orange Walk.  Both teams boasted some of the most talented players.  Their matches were fierce and epic; the stadiums were packed on Sunday whether it was the Ricalde Stadium of the People’s stadium.  Both Clubs marked a special time in Belizean football which stands alone in a unique category that no one will ever forget or come close to recreating.  It is no wonder they were called the Glory Guys!   

The team is based in Corozal Town.  Their home stadium is Ricalde Stadium.

Previous names
 1991–95 – La Victoria FC
 1997–98 – CFC Corozal Football Club
 1998–99 – Midsouth FC
 1999-01 – La Victoria Dolphins FC
 2001–02 – Sagitun FC
 2002–03 – Corozal Victory FC
 2008–09 – Nizhee Corozal FC

Achievements
Belize Premier Football League: 3
1991–92, 1993–94 as La Victoria FC, 2009 (Spring)

Top scorers
 1993–94 – Denmark Casey (La Victoria FC) – 9 goals – Runner-up
 1994–95 – Jason Hall (La Victoria FC) – 6 goals – Runner-up
 1996–97 – David McCauley (FC Corozal) – 14 – Top scorer
 1997–98 – Oliver Hendricks (FC Corozal) – 7 goals – Runner-up
 1998–99 – Oliver Hendricks (La Victoria Dolphins) – 14 goals – Top scorer
 2002–03 – Rupert Smith (Corozal Victory FC) – 6 goals – Runner-up

Notable squad Members

List of coaches
  Pascual Noralez

Football clubs in Belize
1985 establishments in Belize

de:FC Belize
pl:Belize FC